The 2011 Japan Super Series was the eighth super series tournament of the 2011 BWF Super Series in badminton. The tournament was held in Tokyo, Japan, from 20 to 25 September 2011 and had a total purse of $200,000.

Men's singles

Seeds

  Lee Chong Wei
  Lin Dan
  Peter Gade
  Chen Long
  Taufik Hidayat (first round)
  Chen Jin (quarterfinal)
  Nguyen Tien Minh (first round)
  Du Pengyu (first round)

Top half

Bottom half

Finals

Women's singles

Seeds

  Wang Yihan
  Wang Shixian (quarterfinal)
  Wang Xin (second round)
  Saina Nehwal
  Tine Baun (quarterfinal)
  Liu Xin
  Cheng Shao-Chieh (first round)
  Juliane Schenk

Top half

Bottom half

Finals

Men's doubles

Seeds

  Cai Yun / Fu Haifeng
  Mathias Boe / Carsten Mogensen (first round)
  Koo Kien Keat / Tan Boon Heong
  Muhammad Ahsan / Bona Septano
  Jung Jae-sung / Yoo Yeon-seong (first round, retired)
  Markis Kido / Hendra Setiawan
  Alvent Yulianto Chandra / Hendra Aprida Gunawan (quarterfinal)
  Hirokatsu Hashimoto / Noriyasu Hirata (first round)

Top half

Bottom half

Finals

Women's doubles

Seeds

  Wang Xiaoli / Yu Yang (withdrew)
  Miyuki Maeda / Satoko Suetsuna (first round)
  Mizuki Fujii / Reika Kakiiwa
  Tian Qing / Zhao Yunlei (second round)
  Cheng Wen-hsing / Chien Yu-chin
  Shizuka Matsuo / Mami Naito
  Ha Jung-eun / Kim Min-jung (quarterfinal)
  Meiliana Jauhari / Greysia Polii (second round)

Top half

Bottom half

Finals

Mixed doubles

Seeds

  Zhang Nan / Zhao Yunlei
  Tantowi Ahmad / Lilyana Natsir (second round)
  Sudket Prapakamol / Saralee Thoungthongkam (quarterfinal)
  Joachim Fischer Nielsen / Christinna Pedersen
  Chen Hung-ling / Cheng Wen-hsing
  Songphon Anugritayawon / Kunchala Voravichitchaikul (second round)
  Michael Fuchs / Birgit Michels
  Fran Kurniawan / Pia Zebadiah Bernadeth (first round)

Top half

Bottom half

Finals

References

External links 
 Official website

2011 Japan Super Series
Japan Super Series
Japan